The 2022 North Bengal International Gold Cup is the inaugural edition of North Bengal International Gold Cup, an international club football tournament hosted by the FC Uttor Bongo and Under the Overall Supervision Centre for Bangladesh India Friendship. It will be held from 4 to 18 November 2022.

Participants clubs
There will be six teams contesting in the tournament.

Venues
The matches will played following these six venues.

Draw
The draw ceremony was held at Siliguri, West Bengal in India on 26 October 2022. In the group stage will held two matches, two teams was directly enter Semi-finals and others two via playing group stage matches.

Round Matches Dates

Group stages

Tiebreakers
Teams were ranked according to points (3 points for a win, 1 point for a draw, 0 points for a loss), and if tied on points, the following tie-breaking criteria were applied, in the order given, to determine the rankings.
Points in head-to-head matches among tied teams;
Goal difference in head-to-head matches among tied teams;
Goals scored in head-to-head matches among tied teams;
If more than two teams are tied, and after applying all head-to-head criteria above, a subset of teams are still tied, all head-to-head criteria above are reapplied exclusively to this subset of teams;
Goal difference in all group matches;
Goals scored in all group matches;
Penalty shoot-out if only two teams were tied and they met in the last round of the group;
Disciplinary points (yellow card = 1 point, red card as a result of two yellow cards = 3 points, direct red card = 3 points, yellow card followed by direct red card = 4 points);
Drawing of lots.

Group A

Group B

Knockout stage
 In the knockout stage, extra time and penalty shoot-out are used to decide the winner if necessary.

Bracket

Semi-finals

Third place match

Final

Statistics

Goalscorers

References

Football in Bangladesh
Bangladesh
1